Cutie Bunny is the second EP by Nana Kitade, released July 12, 2006. It mostly consists of opening themes for various anime shows and covers of other artists' songs. The EP peaked at #79 on the Oricon chart. The full title of the EP is "Cutie Bunny: 菜奈的ロック大作戦♥ コードネームはC.B.R.".

Track listing

Charts

References

External links
 Official Website Sony Music Japan

Nana Kitade EPs
2006 EPs
Japanese-language EPs